Svastra petulca is a species of long-horned bee in the family Apidae. It is found in Central America and North America.

Subspecies
These two subspecies belong to the species Svastra petulca:
 Svastra petulca petulca (Cresson, 1878)
 Svastra petulca suffusa (Cresson, 1878)

References

Further reading

External links

 

Apinae
Articles created by Qbugbot
Insects described in 1878